John Leonard Harrison (1917–1972) was a British zoologist.

He came to Singapore as a major of the British army in 1945 where he met his later wife Song Kiew Ying. He worked as a zoologist at the Queensland Institute of Medical Research in Australia in 1951. In 1961, he was an associate professor of zoology at Singapore's Nanyang University. In 1963 he moved to the National University of Singapore to become a professor of Zoology. His son Bernard Harrison was chief executive officer of the Singapore Zoo from 1983 to 2002.

Publications (selected)
1954: Malayan Squirrels (Including Tree-Shrews and the Flying Lemur) 
1955: The Apes and Monkeys of Malaya (including the Slow Loris)
1956: Malayan Animal Life
1962: The food of some Innisfail [Queensland] mammals 
1963: Recommended vernacular names for Malaysian mammals
1964: Guide to mammals of the Malay Peninsula
1964: An Introduction to the Mammals of Sabah
1966: An introduction to mammals of Singapore and Malaya

External links
Short biography

British zoologists
1917 births
1972 deaths
20th-century British zoologists
British expatriates in Australia
British emigrants to Singapore